Paik were foot soldiers during the medieval period in India. They were used in offensive and defensive combat specialised in archery.

History

Delhi sultanate
During the rule of the Delhi Sultanate, Paik were foot soldiers used in offensive and defensive combat. They were specialised in archery. It is mentioned in texts written by Ibn Battuta that Paik were recruited from Multan and they have to given test of archery. Their salary was fixed.

Assam

The official record of Aurangzeb state that the king of Assam, Rudra Singha collected around 4 lakh Paik to fight with Bengal in 1714. Out of 4 lakh paik, 2.6 lakh were Kanri paik or foot soldiers. Paik were engaged in building embarkment, clearing forest, construction of roads, houses, royal palace and employed as soldiers.

Odisha
In Odisha, Paik were foot soldiers employed by kings until British rule. During Paika Rebellion, Paika rebelled against Company rule in India in 1817 in Khurdha.

See also
Military history of India

References 

Indian feudalism
Indian words and phrases